The Black Forest Girl is a 1950 West German drama film directed by Hans Deppe and starring Paul Hörbiger, Sonja Ziemann, and Rudolf Prack. It is based on the 1917 operetta of the same title by Leon Jessel and August Neidhart. The film was a huge commercial success, both the biggest hit that year and the most popular film since the war. Within two years fourteen million tickets were sold in West Germany, and on the strength of it Sonja Ziemann and Rudolf Prack topped the popularity charts and received Bambi awards.

The film's success revived the popularity of Heimatfilm, which came to dominate the German box office over the coming decade.

Production
It was made at the Tempelhof Studios in Berlin while Location shooting took place in the Black Forest. The film's sets were designed by the art director Gabriel Pellon. Shot in Agfacolor, it was the first colour film to be shot in western Germany since the Second World War. An East German production Heart of Stone was also made in colour the same year.

Cast

References

Bibliography

External links 

 (German dialogue)
 The Black Forest Girl at filmportal.de/en

1950 films
1950 romantic drama films
1950s romantic musical films
German romantic musical films
West German films
1950s German-language films
German romantic drama films
Remakes of German films
Films based on operettas
Films shot at Tempelhof Studios
1950s German films